Stephanie Bolster (born 1969) is a Canadian poet and professor of creative writing at Concordia University, Montreal.

History 
She holds a Bachelor of Fine Arts in Creative Writing (1991) and a Master of Fine Arts (1994) from the University of British Columbia. Her first book, White Stone: The Alice Poems, won the Governor General's Award for poetry in 1998. Bolster's current project, "Long Exposure", is a book-length poem that takes as its starting point Robert Polidori's post-disaster photographs of New Orleans and Chernobyl. 

In 2004, Bolster edited and published The Ishtar Gate, featuring the poetry of Dutch-Canadian poet Diana Brebner. Bolster also acknowledged the support of Hendrika Ruger in previously publishing Brebner's work in years prior.

Awards
1993 Norma Epstein Award for Creative Writing
1996 Bronwen Wallace Memorial Award for Poetry
1997 Contemporary Verse 2 poetry competition
1997 The Malahat Review Long Poem Prize
1998 Governor General's Award
1998 Poetry Chapbook Contest, Mother Tongue Press
1999 Gerald Lampert Award
2000 Lampman-Scott Award 
2003 Great Blue Heron Poetry Competition, The Antigonish Review

Works

Poetry
Three Bloody Words (above/ground press, Ottawa, 1996). Chapbook, published in edition of 300.
Inside A Tent of Skin: 9 Poems from the National Gallery of Ottawa. (Mother Tongue Press, 1998). Limited edition chapbook. 
White Stone: The Alice Poems (Véhicule Editions, 1998).
Two Bowls of Milk (McClelland & Stewart, 1999).
Pavilion (McClelland & Stewart, 2002).
A Page from the Wonders of Life on Earth (Brick Books, London, ON, 2011).
Three Bloody Words: Twentieth Anniversary Edition (above/ground press, Ottawa, 2016).

Edited works
The Ishtar Gate: Last and Selected Poems, Diana Brebner, edited and with an introduction by Stephanie Bolster. Montréal and Kingston: McGill-Queen's University Press, Hugh MacLennan Poetry Series, 2004.
The Best Canadian Poetry in English 2008, edited by Stephanie Bolster, series/advisory editor Molly Peacock. Toronto: Tightrope Books, 2008.
Penned: Zoo Poems, edited by Stephanie Bolster, Katia Grubisic, and Simon Reader. Montreal: Signal Editions/Véhicule Press, 2009.
Global Poetry Anthology, edited by Valerie Bloom, Stephanie Bolster, Frank M. Chipasula, Fred D'Aguiar, Michael Harris, John Kinsella, Sinéad Morrissey, Odia Ofeimun, Eric Ormsby, and Anand Thakore. Montreal: Signal Editions/Véhicule Press, 2012.

References

External links
Stephanie Bolster Faculty Profile, Department of English, Concordia University

1969 births
Living people
Canadian women poets
University of British Columbia alumni
Academic staff of Concordia University
Governor General's Award-winning poets
20th-century Canadian poets
21st-century Canadian poets
20th-century Canadian women writers
21st-century Canadian women writers